Phalacrus is a genus of beetles belonging to the family Phalacridae.

The genus has almost cosmopolitan distribution.

Species:
 Phalacrus apicalis Melsheimer, 1845 
 Phalacrus arizonicus Casey

References

Phalacridae
Beetle genera